The Latin Grammy Award for Best Christian Album (Portuguese Language) is given every year since the 5th Latin Grammy Awards ceremony, which took place at the Shrine Auditorium in Los Angeles. In 2002 and 2003 the category was named Best Christian Album and rewarded the Christian albums in Spanish and Portuguese. In 2004, the category was split into two depending on the language, with Spanish language releases being awarded in the Best Christian Album (Spanish Language) category ever since.

Brazilian singer Aline Barros holds the record of most wins in the category with eight, followed by Soraya Moraes and Fernanda Brum with two wins each.

Winners and nominees

2000s

Best Christian Album

Best Christian Album (Portuguese Language)

2010s

2020s

References

External links 
Official website of the Latin Grammy Awards

 
Christian Album (Portuguese Language)